Alan Ernest Wood (born 1 December 1954) is an English former professional footballer who played for Charlton Athletic and Dover as a central defender.

References

1954 births
Living people
English footballers
Association football defenders
Sportspeople from Gravesend, Kent
Charlton Athletic F.C. players
Dover F.C. players
English Football League players